Ayub Shah Durrani, also known as Ayub Shah Abdali, son of Timur Shah Durrani, ruled Afghanistan from 1819 to 1823. He was an Afghan from the Pashtun ethnic group. He was the second oldest son of Timur Shah. He killed his brother Ali Shah for the throne. He only ruled four years, holding off his own brothers and the Barakzai and Indian tribes from nearby. He was imprisoned by the Barakzai and his brother took the throne, shortly losing it to the Barakzai.

He was succeeded in 1823 by Dost Mohammad Khan, founder of the Barakzai dynasty.

References

1837 deaths
19th-century Afghan monarchs
Emirs of Afghanistan
Ayub Shah
Year of birth unknown
Pashtun people
19th-century Afghan politicians
19th-century monarchs in Asia
Fratricides